The 2020–21 Baltic Men Volleyball League, known as Credit 24 Champions League for sponsorship reasons, was the 16th edition of the highest level of club volleyball in the Baltic states.

Participating teams

The following teams participate in the 2020–21 edition of Baltic Men Volleyball League.

Venues, personnel and kits

Coaching changes

Regular season
All participating 10 clubs are playing according to the double round robin system.

|}

Updated to match(es) played on 3 April 2021. Source: Credit24 Champions League Regular Season

Playoffs
The four winners of each series qualify to the Final four, while the other four teams are eliminated.

Final four
Organizer: Saaremaa 
Venue: Kuressaare Sports Centre, Kuressaare, Estonia

Semifinals

|}

3rd place match

|}

Final

|}

Final ranking

Final four awards

Most Valuable Player
  Renee Teppan (Selver Tallinn) 
Best Setter
  Renet Vanker (Selver Tallinn)  
Best Outside Hitters
  Kristaps Šmits (Jēkabpils Lūši)
  Oliver Orav (Selver Tallinn)   

Best Middle Blockers
  Wennder Lopes (Saaremaa)
  Mihkel Varblane (Selver Tallinn)
Best Opposite Hitter
  Hindrek Pulk (Saaremaa)  
Best Libero
  Johan Vahter (Saaremaa)

References

External links
Official website

Baltic Men Volleyball League
Baltic Men Volleyball League
Baltic Men Volleyball League
Baltic Men Volleyball League
Baltic Men Volleyball League
Baltic Men Volleyball League
Baltic Men Volleyball League
Baltic Men Volleyball League
Baltic Men Volleyball League
Baltic Men Volleyball League